Henry Botting Haynes was an Anglican priest in the first half of the 20th century.

Blennerhassett was educated at Moore College and ordained in 1900. He served curacies in Sydney and Swan Hill; and incumbencies at Kyabram then Bendigo. He was the Archdeacon of Kyneton from 1914 to 1917; and of The Murray from 1917 to 1924.

References

20th-century Australian Anglican priests
Archdeacons of Kyneton
Archdeacons of The Murray
Moore Theological College alumni
Year of birth missing
Year of death missing